Ute Christensen (born 21 December 1955 in Neubrandenburg, East Germany) is a German actress.

Selected filmography 
1980: Derrick - Season 7, Episode 1: "Hanna, liebe Hanna" (TV)
1980:  (TV series)
1981: Tod eines Schülers (TV miniseries)
1983: Ich heirate eine Familie (TV series)
1986: Liebling Kreuzberg (TV series)
1988: Pan Tau - Der Film
1994: The Dragon Ring (TV miniseries)

External links

ZBF Agency Berlin 

1955 births
Living people
People from Neubrandenburg
People from Bezirk Neubrandenburg
German film actresses
German television actresses
20th-century German actresses